Herbert Meitner (born 1913) was an Israeli footballer who played as an forward for Hapoel Tel Aviv and Hapoel Rishon at club level, and the Mandatory Palestine national team internationally.

Meitner took part in Mandatory Palestine's last international match against Lebanon in 1940, scoring one goal; it was his only international cap.

References

External links
 

1913 births
Year of death missing
Jewish Israeli sportspeople
Jewish footballers
Association football outside forwards
Association football forwards
Mandatory Palestine footballers
Israeli footballers
Mandatory Palestine international footballers
Hapoel Tel Aviv F.C. players
Hapoel Rishon LeZion F.C. players